Dazmon Jaroid Cameron (born January 15, 1997) is an American professional baseball outfielder in the Baltimore Orioles organization. He attended Eagle's Landing Christian Academy in McDonough, Georgia, and was selected by the Houston Astros in the 2015 MLB draft. The Astros traded Cameron to the Detroit Tigers in 2017 and he made his MLB debut in 2020. His father is former All-Star outfielder Mike Cameron.

Early life and amateur career
Cameron is the oldest of four children born to JaBreka and Mike Cameron. Mike played in Major League Baseball (MLB) for eight teams over seventeen seasons. His father began to instruct him on how to play baseball when he was 13 years old.

Cameron attended Eagle's Landing Christian Academy in McDonough, Georgia, where he played for the school's baseball team. As a freshman, he had a .392 batting average. He improved his power in his sophomore year, finishing the season with a .434 batting average, a .764 slugging percentage, seven home runs, and 28 runs batted in (RBIs) in 106 at bats. He committed to enrolling at Florida State University on a college baseball scholarship, to play for the Florida State Seminoles.

In the summer of 2014, Cameron was a member of the USA Baseball's 18-and-under national team, competing against other nations from the Pan American Baseball Confederation. He also appeared in the 2013 and 2014 Under Armour All-America Baseball Game. As a senior in 2015, Cameron had a .455 average with eight home runs and 32 RBIs, and was chosen as Georgia's Gatorade Player of the Year.

Professional career
Cameron was considered a potential first overall draft pick in the 2015 MLB draft; however, he fell into the competitive lottery pick round because of rumored high contract demands.

Houston Astros
The Houston Astros took him 37th overall; as the team with the largest draft spending pool, they were thought to have the best chance to sign Cameron. Cameron signed with the Astros for a reported $4 million signing bonus. After signing, Cameron reported to the Rookie League GCL Astros. After batting only .222 with six RBIs in 21 games, he was reassigned to the Greeneville Astros of the Appalachian League where he improved, batting .272 with 11 RBIs and a .721 OPS in 30 games.

Cameron began the 2016 season with the Quad Cities River Bandits of the Class A Midwest League. He struggled with Quad Cities, batting .143 in 21 games, and was reassigned to the Tri-City ValleyCats of the Class A-Short Season New York–Penn League. After playing in 19 games, in which he batted .278, Cameron broke his finger when he was hit by a pitch in July, ending his season. Cameron returned to Quad Cities for the start of the 2017 season.

Detroit Tigers
On August 31, 2017, the Astros traded Cameron, Franklin Pérez, and Jake Rogers to the Detroit Tigers for Justin Verlander. Detroit assigned him to the West Michigan Whitecaps of the Midwest League. In 123 total games between Quad Cities and West Michigan, Cameron batted .271 with 14 home runs and 74 RBIs along with 32 stolen bases. Cameron began the 2018 season with the Lakeland Flying Tigers of the Class A-Advanced Florida State League, and he batted .259 with three home runs and 20 RBIs in 58 games played. On June 18, the Tigers promoted Cameron to the Erie SeaWolves of the Class AA Eastern League. After he batted .285 with five home runs and 35 RBIs in 53 games, the Tigers promoted him to the Toledo Mud Hens of the Class AAA International League on August 17. In 15 games for Toledo, he hit .211 with six RBIs. After the regular season, Cameron played for the Mesa Solar Sox of the Arizona Fall League. Cameron returned to Toledo for the 2019 season, hitting .214/.330/.377/.707 with 13 home runs and 43 RBI.

Cameron was added to the Tigers 40–man roster following the 2019 season. On September 9, 2020, the Tigers promoted him to the major leagues and he made his major league debut that day. On September 11, Cameron recorded his first major league hit, an RBI single, off of Chicago White Sox starter Lucas Giolito. Overall with the 2020 Detroit Tigers, Cameron batted .193 with no home runs and 3 RBIs in 17 games.

Cameron made his debut with the 2021 Detroit Tigers on June 10, and the following night recorded his first major league home run, a two-run hit off Chicago White Sox closer Liam Hendriks in the bottom of the 9th inning, tying the game and extending it to extra innings. On June 23, in a game against the St. Louis Cardinals, Cameron stole a base against Yadier Molina, making him and his father Mike the first father-son duo to steal bases against Molina.

On June 10, 2022 Cameron was placed on the Injured List (IL) by the Tigers. He had only 64 at-bats with the major league club in 2022, hitting .219 with one home run.

Baltimore Orioles
Cameron was claimed off waivers by the Baltimore Orioles on November 9, 2022. On December 2, 2022, he was sent outright off the 40-man roster.

See also
 List of second-generation Major League Baseball players

References

External links

Baseball Instinct

1997 births
Living people
African-American baseball players
Baseball players from Georgia (U.S. state)
Cangrejeros de Santurce (baseball) players
Detroit Tigers players
Erie SeaWolves players
Gulf Coast Astros players
Greeneville Astros players
Lakeland Flying Tigers players
Liga de Béisbol Profesional Roberto Clemente outfielders
Major League Baseball outfielders
Mesa Solar Sox players
People from McDonough, Georgia
Quad Cities River Bandits players
Toledo Mud Hens players
Tri-City ValleyCats players
West Michigan Whitecaps players
21st-century African-American sportspeople